Windley Key Fossil Reef Geological State Park is a Florida State Park located at mile marker 85.5 near Islamorada. It was a former quarry used by Henry Flagler in the early 1900s to help his building of the Overseas Railroad. Following the railroad's completion, it was a source for decorative stone pieces called Keystone. Now on display are exposed sections of fossilized coral, as well as some of the original quarry machinery. The Hurricane Monument at Mile Marker 82 in Islamorada is constructed of keystone from the quarry.

Hours
Florida state parks are open between 8 a.m. and sundown every day of the year (including holidays). The visitor center is open Thursday through Monday, 8:00 am to 5:00 pm.

Gallery

References and external links

 Windley Key Fossil Reef Geological State Park at Florida State Parks

State parks of Florida
Parks in Monroe County, Florida
Tourist attractions in the Florida Keys
Protected areas established in 1999
Fossil parks in the United States
Paleontology in Florida
Paleontological protected areas in the United States